The 1990 PBA Expansion Draft was the first expansion draft of the Philippine Basketball Association (PBA). The draft was held before the start of the 1990 PBA season, so that the newly founded teams Pepsi Hotshots and Pop Cola Sizzlers could acquire players for the upcoming season. A "protect 9" scheme was implemented for the draft, meaning that the six existing PBA teams can protect up to nine players in their rosters and will unconditionally release three players to the expansion pool.

Key

Selections

Notes
 Number of years played in the PBA prior to the draft

References

Philippine Basketball Association expansion drafts
Expansion Draft
TNT Tropang Giga
Pop Cola Panthers